Zhejiang Radio and Television Group (ZRTG), is China's fourth-biggest television network after China Central Television (CCTV), Hunan Broadcasting System (HBS), and Jiangsu Broadcasting Corporation (JSBC). The television network is owned by the Zhejiang provincial government. The network is based in Hangzhou in Zhejiang.

History
Before the establishment of Zhejiang Radio and Television Group the local television stations first aired in Hangzhou and northern Zhejiang in the 1960s. ZRTG was established in 8 November 2001 to compete with other major Television networks and expanded its network through nationwide satellite television on 1994.

Television Channels
 Zhejiang Television (Satellite television)
 Qianjiang Channel
 Zhejiang Economic Channel
 Zhejiang Education Technology Channel
 Joy Television (Zhejiang Drama and Television Entertainment Channel)
 Channel 6
 Zhejiang Public and News Channel
 Zhejiang Children Channel
 Channel Tunnel
 Zhejiang International Channel
Best One home shopping channel
The age of Digital

Radio stations
 The voice of Zhejiang(FM88 FM101.6 AM810)
Economic radio(FM95)
Traffic radio(FM 93)
Music radio(FM96.8)
Livelihood FM 99.6
Hostess Radio(FM104.5 AM603)
City Radio(FM 107)
News Radio (FM98.8 AM1530)

Production
ZRTG have broadcast notable programming such as The Voice of China, often referred to as the Chinese version of the Dutch's reality talent show The Voice of Holland.

 The Voice of China
 Chinese Dream Show
 Splash!
 Do You Remember
 Fall in Love
 My Oscar
 Break Away
 Mr. Zhou Live Show
 Star Know My Heart

References

Television networks in China
Television channels and stations established in 1994
Mass media in Hangzhou